The National Labour Union of Morocco (French: Union National du Travail au Maroc, Arabic: الاتحاد الوطني للشغل بالمغرب) (UNTM) is a national trade union center in Morocco. It was founded in 1973.

The UNMT is affiliated with the Justice and Development Party (PJD).

References

Trade unions in Morocco
International Confederation of Arab Trade Unions
Economy of the Arab League
Trade unions established in 1973